Will Reed (born 3 November 2001) is a Welsh rugby union player for Dragons in the United Rugby Championship. Reed's primary position is fly-half or fullback.

Rugby Union career

Professional career

Reed was named in the Dragons academy squad for the 2021–22 season.

References

2001 births
Living people
Dragons RFC players
Rugby union fly-halves
Rugby union fullbacks
Welsh rugby union players